Pavel Grechishko (born 23 March 1989) is a Belarusian professional footballer who plays for Slutsk. He has played under coach Yuri Puntus in several teams.

References

External links
 Profile at Slavia website
 
 

1989 births
Living people
Belarusian footballers
Association football defenders
Belarusian expatriate footballers
Expatriate footballers in the Czech Republic
FC Energetik-BGU Minsk players
FK Baník Most players
FC Gomel players
FC Smolevichi players
FC Slavia Mozyr players
FC Belshina Bobruisk players
FC Krumkachy Minsk players
FC Slutsk players